Cymindis arnoldii is a species of ground beetle in the subfamily Harpalinae. It was described by Kabak in 1999.

References

arnoldii
Beetles described in 1999